Estadio Olímpico Atahualpa is a multi-purpose stadium in Quito, Ecuador.  It is currently used primarily for football matches and has a capacity of 35,724.

Overview
Built in 1951, it sits at the intersection of the Avenida 6 de Diciembre and Avenida Naciones Unidas, two major streets in Ecuador's capital city. Football clubs Deportivo Quito, El Nacional and Universidad Católica use the facility for their home games, although other prominent teams in the city have used the stadium for home games in the past. The stadium is named after the Inca Emperor Atahualpa.

At this venue, the Ecuador national team has defeated Brazil twice, Paraguay three times, and Argentina twice, amongst others, securing their positions in Korea/Japan 2002, Germany 2006, and Brazil 2014. During the qualifying for Germany 2006 and Brazil 2014, Ecuador qualified and remained undefeated at this stadium. This record was broken by Brazil in 2018 World Cup qualification after Brazil defeated Ecuador 0-3 in the stadium.

The current structure was set to be demolished in late 2020 to make way for a new, more modern venue, but as of 2023, that did not happen.

References

External links

 Concentración Deportiva de Pichincha's website

L.D.U. Quito
Estadio Olimpico Atahualpa
Estadio Olimpico Atahualpa
Sports venues completed in 1951
Football venues in Quito
National stadiums
Copa América stadiums
Multi-purpose stadiums in Ecuador
1951 establishments in Ecuador